Egon Bazini (7 September 1911 – 5 March 1998) was a Hungarian rower. He competed in the men's double sculls event at the 1936 Summer Olympics.

References

1911 births
1998 deaths
Hungarian male rowers
Olympic rowers of Hungary
Rowers at the 1936 Summer Olympics
Rowers from Budapest